Baldhill Dam is a dam in Barnes County, North Dakota, about 10 miles north-northwest of Valley City in the eastern part of the state.

The earthen and concrete dam was constructed in 1951 by the United States Army Corps of Engineers with three tainter gates, a height of 60 feet, and 1800 feet in length at its crest.  It impounds the Sheyenne River for irrigation water storage and for flood control.  The dam is owned and operated by the Corps of Engineers, St. Paul District.

The reservoir it creates, Lake Ashtabula, is a riverine lake oriented north to south, about 27 miles long.  The name "Ashtabula" is a Native American word meaning "Fish River." It has a water surface area of 5,234  acres, a maximum capacity of 156,000 acre-feet; and normal storage of 69,500 acre-feet.  Popular for recreation, Lake Ashtabula contains walleye, northern pike, white bass, yellow perch and black bullheads.  The Corps of Engineers maintains seven recreation areas around the lake.

References

External links 
 
 U.S. Army Corps of Engineers, Lake Ashtabula Project
 Recreation.gov Website for Lake Ashtabula
 Lake Ashtabula Recreation Brochure

Dams in North Dakota
Reservoirs in North Dakota
United States Army Corps of Engineers dams
Buildings and structures in Barnes County, North Dakota
Embankment dams
Dams completed in 1951
Bodies of water of Barnes County, North Dakota